Edris Fetisleam (born 25 July 1999) is a Romanian professional tennis player.

Fetisleam has a career high ATP singles ranking of 673 achieved on 14 October 2019. He also has a career high ATP doubles ranking of 1029 achieved on 5 August 2019.

Fetisleam represents Romania at the Davis Cup making his debut on 8 April 2018 against Morocco's Yassir Kilani.

Davis Cup

Singles performances (1–0)

References

External links

1999 births
Living people
Romanian male tennis players
Romanian people of Crimean Tatar descent
21st-century Romanian people